This is a list of notable events in music that took place in the year 1945.

Specific locations
1945 in British music
1945 in Norwegian music

Specific genres
1945 in country music
1945 in jazz

Events
January 27 – Billboard has added a third chart to measure record popularity, "Records Most-Played On the Air". which will track disk jockey ("spinners", "dial twisters") activity.
February 13–15 – Bombing of Dresden in World War II destroys the Semperoper (Saxon state opera house).
February 13 – The premiere of Sergei Prokofiev's Symphony No. 5 under the composer's baton at the Moscow Conservatory is delayed by a military salute marking the Red Army's crossing of the Vistula.
July 26 – Composer Ernest John Moeran marries cellist Peers Coetmore.
July 27 – Benjamin Britten and Yehudi Menuhin perform concerts at Bergen-Belsen displaced persons camp.
August 19 – Dick Powell marries June Allyson.
September 1 – Trio Lescano's last concert on Italian radio.
September 4 – Beethoven's Fidelio becomes the first opera to be performed in Berlin following World War II.
October 25 – Philharmonia Orchestra plays its first concert, in London.
November – Hans Schmidt-Isserstedt conducts the North German Radio Symphony Orchestra in its first concert. 
November 26 – Charlie Parker makes his first recording as a leader, also featuring Miles Davis.
The Motion Picture Daily Fame Poll designates Bing Crosby "Top Male Vocalist" for the ninth straight year.
Antal Doráti becomes conductor of the Dallas Symphony Orchestra.
Reynaldo Hahn is appointed director of the Paris Opéra.
Frank Sinatra leaves Your Hit Parade to appear on Max Factor Presents Frank Sinatra and, starting in September, Songs By Sinatra.
Ruth Weston runs away from home in Portsmouth, Virginia, to marry trumpeter Jimmy Brown and begin her career as a singer.
Marlene Dietrich appears on the CBS radio network, accompanied by accordionist John Serry Sr.

Publications
Spade Cooley – Spade Cooley's Western Swing Song Folio (the first songbook to identify the big Western dance band music as Western Swing)

Albums released
Nat King Cole – King Cole Trio
Bing Crosby
Merry Christmas
Selections from Going My Way
Glenn Miller – Glenn Miller
Django Reinhardt – Paris 1945

Top popular records 1945

For each Year in Music (beginning 1940) and Year in Country Music (beginning 1939), a comprehensive Year End Top Records section can be found at mid-page (popular), and on the Country page. These charts are meant to replace the charts Billboard prints at the end of each year, because they are better. Keep reading.

The charts are compiled from data published by Billboard magazine, using their formulas, with slight modifications. Most important, there are no songs missing or truncated by Billboard's holiday deadline. Each year, records included enter the charts between the prior November and early December. Each week, fifteen points are awarded to the number one record, then nine points for number two, eight points for number three, and so on. This system rewards songs that reach the highest positions, as well as those that had the longest chart runs. This is our adjustment to Mr. Whitburn's formula, which places no. 1 records on top, then no 2 and so on, ordered by weeks at that position. This allows a record with 4 weeks at no. 1 that only lasted 6 weeks to be rated very high. Here, the total points of a song's complete chart run determines its position. Our chart has more songs, more weeks and may look nothing like Billboard's, but it comes from the exact same surveys. 

Before the Hot100 was implemented in 1958, Billboard magazine measured a record's performance with three charts, 'Best-Selling Popular Retail Records', 'Records Most-Played On the Air' or 'Records Most Played By Disk Jockeys' and 'Most-Played Juke Box Records'. As Billboard did starting in the 1940s, the three totals for each song are  combined, with that number determining the final year-end rank. For example, 1944's "A Hot Time in the Town of Berlin" by Bing and the Andrews Sisters finished at no. 19, despite six weeks at no. 1 on the 'Most-Played Juke Box Records'(JB) chart. It scored 126 points, to go with its Best-Selling chart (BS) total of 0. Martha Tilton's version of "I'll Walk Alone" peaked at no. 4 on the Juke Box chart, which only totalled 65 points, but her BS total was also 65, for a final total of 130, ranking no. 18. Examples like this can be found in "The Billboard" magazine up to 1958. By the way, the 'Records Most-Played On the Air' chart didn't begin until January 1945, which is why we only had two sub-totals.

Our rankings are based on Billboard data, but we also present info on recording and release dates, global sales totals, RIAA and BPI certifications and other awards. Rankings from other genres like 'Hot R&B/Hip-Hop Songs' or 'Most Played Juke Box Race Records', Country charts including 'Most Played Juke Box Folk (Hillbilly) Records', 'Cashbox magazine', and other sources are presented if they exist. We supplement our info with reliable data from the "Discography of American Historical Recordings" website, Joel Whitburn's Pop Memories 1890-1954 and other sources as specified.

The following songs appeared in The Billboard's 'Best Selling Retail Records', 'Records Most-Played On the Air' and 'Most Played Juke Box Records' charts during 1945.

Top race records

At the start of 1945, Billboard magazine published a chart ranking the "most popular records in Harlem" under the title of "the Harlem Hit Parade" (HHP). Rankings were based on a survey of record stores primarily in the Harlem district of New York City, an area which has historically been noted for its African American population. This chart was published for the final time in the issue dated February 10. The following week the magazine launched a new chart in its place, "Most Played Juke Box Race Records", based on reports from juke box operators (details can be found in each issue). For the year-end list of 1945's top R & B records below, peak positions and numbers of weeks from the HHP charts were carried over. 
1945 chronological list of records that reached number one on the "Most Played Juke Box Race Records" chart.

Published popular music
 "All of My Life", words and music: Irving Berlin
 "All Through the Day" w. Oscar Hammerstein II m. Jerome Kern
 "Along the Navajo Trail" w.m. Dick Charles, Eddie DeLange & Larry Markes
 "Apple Honey" m. Woody Herman
 "Aren't You Glad You're You?" w. Johnny Burke m. Jimmy Van Heusen
 "Atlanta G.A." w. Sunny Skylar m. Arthur Shaftel
 "Autumn Serenade" w. Sammy Gallop m. Peter DeRose
 "Be-Baba-Leba" w.m. Helen Humes
 "The Blond Sailor" w. (Eng) Mitchell Parish, Bell Leib m. Jacob Pfeil
 "Boogie Blues" w.m. Gene Krupa & Ray Biondi
 "Caldonia" w.m. Fleecie Moore
 "The Carousel Waltz" w. Richard Rodgers
 "Cement Mixer" w.m. Slim Gaillard & Lee Ricks
 "Chickery Chick" w. Sylvia Dee m. Sidney Lippman
 "Close as Pages in a Book" w. Dorothy Fields m. Sigmund Romberg. Introduced by Maureen Cannon and Wilbur Evans in the musical Up in Central Park
 "Cruising Down the River" w.m. Eily Beadell & Nell Tollerton
 "Day By Day" w. Sammy Cahn m. Paul Weston & Axel Stordahl
 "Detour" w.m. Paul Westmoreland
 "Dig You Later" w. Harold Adamson m. Jimmy McHugh
 "Doctor, Lawyer, Indian Chief" w. Paul Francis Webster m. Hoagy Carmichael
 "Don't Be a Baby, Baby" w. Buddy Kaye m. Howard Steiner
 "The End of the News" w.m. Noël Coward
 "Everything But You" w.m. Don George, Duke Ellington and Harry James.
 "For Sentimental Reasons" w. Deek Watson m. William Best
 "The Frim Fram Sauce" w.m. Joe Ricardel & Redd Evans
 "Full Moon and Empty Arms" w.m. Buddy Kaye & Ted Mossman
 "Give Me the Moon Over Brooklyn" w.m. Jason Matthews & Terry Shand
 "Give Me the Simple Life" w. Harry Ruby m. Rube Bloom
 "Good Good Good (That's You, That's You)" w.m. Fisher Roberts
 "Gotta Be This or That" w.m. Sunny Skylar
 "Guess I'll Hang My Tears Out to Dry" w. Sammy Cahn m. Jule Styne
 "The Gypsy" w.m. Billy Reid
 "Have I Told You Lately that I Love You?" w.m. Scott Wiseman
 "Her Bathing Suit Never Got Wet" w. Charles Tobias m. Nat Simon
 "Hey! Ba-Ba-Re-Bop" w.m. Lionel Hampton & Curley Hamner
 "Homesick – That's All" w.m. Gordon Jenkins
 "The Honeydripper" w.m. Joe Liggins
 "I Can't Begin to Tell You" w. Mack Gordon m. James V. Monaco. Introduced by John Payne and reprised by Betty Grable in the film The Dolly Sisters
 "I Don't Know Enough About You" w.m. Peggy Lee & Dave Barbour
 "I Have But One Heart" Marty Symes, J. Farrow
 "I Wish I Knew" w. Mack Gordon m. Harry Warren. Introduced by Dick Haymes in the film Diamond Horseshoe
 "I Wonder" Gant, Leveen
 "I Wonder What Happened To Him" w.m. Noël Coward
 "If I Loved You" w. Oscar Hammerstein II m. Richard Rodgers. Introduced by John Raitt and Jan Clayton in the musical Carousel.
 "I'll Buy That Dream" w. Herb Magison m. Allie Wrubel
 "I'm a Big Girl Now" w.m. Al Hoffman, Milton Drake & Jerry Livingston
 "I'm Gonna Love That Guy" w.m. Frances Ash
 "In Acapulco" w. Mack Gordon m. Harry Warren. Introduced by Betty Grable in the film Diamond Horseshoe
 "In Love In Vain" w. Leo Robin m. Jerome Kern. Introduced by Louanne Hogan dubbing for Jeanne Crain in the film Centennial Summer
 "In the Middle of May" w. Al Stillman m. Fred Ahlert
 "Isn't It Kinda Fun" w. Oscar Hammerstein II m. Richard Rodgers. Introduced by Dick Haymes and Vivian Blaine in the film State Fair. Performed in the 1962 film version by Ann-Margret and David Street
 "It Might as Well Be Spring" w. Oscar Hammerstein II m. Richard Rodgers. Introduced by Louanne Hogan dubbing for Jeanne Crain in the film State Fair. Performed in the 1962 film version by Anita Gordon dubbing for Pamela Tiffin.
 "It's a Grand Night For Singing" w. Oscar Hammerstein II m. Richard Rodgers
 "It's Been a Long, Long Time" w. Sammy Cahn m. Jule Styne
 "Johnnie Fedora (and Alice Bluebonnet)" w. Allie Wrubel & Ray Gilbert
 "June is Bustin' Out All Over" w. Oscar Hammerstein II m. Richard Rodgers
 "Just a Blue Serge Suit" w.m. Irving Berlin
 "Laura" w. Johnny Mercer m. David Raksin
 "Lavender Blue" w. Larry Morey m. Eliot Daniel
 "Leone Jump" m. John Serry Sr.
 "Let It Snow! Let It Snow! Let It Snow!" w. Sammy Cahn m. Jule Styne
 "Love Letters" w. Edward Heyman m. Victor Young
 "Love on a Greyhound Bus" w. Ralph Blane & Kay Thompson m. George Stoll
 "Matelot" w.m. Noël Coward. Introduced by Graham Payn in the revue Sigh No More
 "Mister Snow" w. Oscar Hammerstein II m. Richard Rodgers
 "Money is the Root of All Evil" w.m. Joan Whitney & Alex Kramer
 "The More I See You" w. Mack Gordon m. Harry Warren
 "Nina" w.m. Noël Coward
 "Oh! What It Seemed To Be" w.m. Bennie Benjamin, George David Weiss & Frankie Carle
 "Personality" w. Johnny Burke m. Jimmy Van Heusen
 "Rodger Young" w.m. Frank Loesser
 "Shoo-Fly Pie and Apple Pan Dowdy" w. Sammy Gallop m. Guy Wood
 "Sigh No More" w.m. Noël Coward
 "Sioux City Sue" w. Ray Freedman m. Dick Thomas
 "Soliloquy" w. Oscar Hammerstein II m. Richard Rodgers
 "Some Sunday Morning" w. Ted Koehler m. M.K. Jerome & Ray Heindorf
 "A Stranger in Town" w.m. Mel Tormé
 "Symphony" w.(Eng) Jack Lawrence m. Alex Alstone
 "Tampico" w.m. Allan Roberts & Doris Fisher
 "(Did You Ever Get) That Feeling in the Moonlight?" w.m. James Cavanaugh, Larry Stock & Ira Schuster
 "That Little Dream Got Nowhere" w. Johnny Burke m. Jimmy Van Heusen
 "That's for Me" w. Oscar Hammerstein II m. Richard Rodgers
 "This Was a Real Nice Clambake" w. Oscar Hammerstein II m. Richard Rodgers
 "Till the End of Time" w.m. Buddy Kaye & Ted Mossman
 "Two Silhouettes" w. Ray Gilbert m. Charles Wolcott
 "Waitin' for the Train to Come In" w.m. Sunny Skylar & Martin Block
 "We'll Be Together Again" w. Frankie Laine m. Carl Fischer
 "We'll Gather Lilacs" w.m. Ivor Novello
 "What's the Use of Wond'rin'?" w. Oscar Hammerstein II m. Richard Rodgers
 "When the Children Are Asleep" w. Oscar Hammerstein II m. Richard Rodgers
 "The Wild, Wild West" w. Johnny Mercer m. Harry Warren from the film The Harvey Girls
 "You'll Never Walk Alone" w. Oscar Hammerstein II m. Richard Rodgers
 "You're a Queer One, Julie Jordan" w. Oscar Hammerstein II m. Richard Rodgers

Classical music

Premieres

Compositions
 Samuel Barber – Cello Concerto
 Béla Bartók 
 Piano Concerto No. 3
 Viola Concerto
 Ernest Bloch – String Quartet No. 2
 Benjamin Britten
 The Holy Sonnets of John Donne for tenor and piano, Op. 35
 String Quartet No. 2 in C major
 John A. Carpenter – The Seven Ages George Crumb 
 Four Pieces for violin and piano
 Sonata for Piano 
 Four Songs for voice, clarinet and piano
 Luigi Dallapiccola – Ciaccona, Intermezzo e Adagio, for solo cello
 Wolfgang Fortner – Sonata for violin and piano
 Jesús Guridi – Pyrenean Symphony Paul Hindemith – String Quartet No. 7 in E-flat
 Dmitry Kabalevsky – Piano Sonata No. 2
 Paul von Klenau – Symphony No. 9
 Erich W. Korngold – Violin Concerto
 Rued Langgaard
 Symphony No. 10 Hin Tordenbolig, BVN. 298
 Symphony No. 11 Ixion, BVN. 303
 G. Francesco Malipiero – Symphony No. 3 
 Frank Martin – Petite symphonie concertante Bohuslav Martinů
 Etudes and Polkas, H. 308, for piano
 Flute Sonata, H 306
 Cello Concerto No. 2, H 304
 Czech Rhapsody, H 307
 Symphony No. 4, H 305
 Thunderbolt P-47, scherzo for orchestra, H 309
 Olivier Messiaen – Harawi Douglas Moore – Symphony No. 2
 Walter Piston – Sonatina for Violin and Harpsichord
 Sergei Prokofiev – Ivan the Terrible Nico Richter – Serenade for flute, violin and viola Henri Sauguet – Les forains, ballet
 Dmitri Shostakovich 
 Symphony No. 9
 Children's Notebook Richard Strauss 
 Metamorphosen for 23 solo strings
 Oboe Concerto
 Igor Stravinsky 
 Ebony Concerto
 Symphony in Three Movements Michael Tippett – Symphony No. 1
 Various composers (Castelnuovo-Tedesco, Milhaud, Schoenberg, Shilkret, Stravinsky, Tansman and Toch) – Genesis Suite Heitor Villa-Lobos
Piano Concerto No. 1
String Quartet No. 9
Symphony No. 7 Odisséia da paz (Peace Odyssey)

Opera
Amy Beach – Cabildo (Athens, Georgia, 27 February)
Benjamin Britten – Peter GrimesFrederick Jacobi – The Prodigal SonFilm
Aaron Copland – The Cummington StoryAram Khachaturian – Prisoner No. 217Max Steiner – Mildred Pierce (film)Jazz

Musical theatre
 Are You with It? (Music: Harry Revel Lyrics: Arnold B. Horwitt Book: Sam Perrin and George Balzer). Broadway production opened at the Century Theatre on November 10 and ran for 266 performances.
 Billion Dollar Baby (Music: Morton Gould Book & Lyrics: Betty Comden and Adolph Green). Broadway production opened at the Alvin Theatre on December 21 and ran for 220 performances. Starring Mitzi Green, Joan McCracken, William Tabbert, Danny Daniels and Shirley Van.
 Carousel (Music: Richard Rodgers Lyrics and Book: Oscar Hammerstein II). Broadway production opened at the Majestic Theatre on April 19 and ran for 890 performances.
 The Day Before Spring (Music: Frederick Loewe Lyrics and Book: Alan Jay Lerner). Broadway production opened on November 22 at the National Theatre and ran for 165 performances.
 The Firebrand of Florence (Book: Ira Gershwin & Edwin Justus Mayer, Music: Kurt Weill, Lyrics: Ira Gershwin). Broadway production opened at the Alvin Theatre on March 22 and ran for 43 performances. Starring Lotte Lenya, Earl Wrightson, Beverly Tyler and Melville Cooper.Follow The Girls (Music: Phil Charig Lyrics: Dan Shapiro and Milton Pascal Book: Guy Bolton, Eddie Davis and Fred Thompson). London production opened at Her Majesty's Theatre on October 25 and ran for 572 performances.
 Marinka. Broadway production opened at the Winter Garden Theatre on July 18 and moved to the Ethel Barrymore Theatre on October 1 for a total run of 165 performances
 Perchance To Dream (Music, Lyrics and Book: Ivor Novello). London production opened at the London Hippodrome on April 21 and ran for 1022 performances.
 The Red Mill (Music: Victor Herbert Lyrics and Book: Henry Blossom). Broadway revival opened on October 16 at the Ziegfeld Theatre and ran for 531 performances.
 Sigh No More. London revue opened at the Piccadilly Theatre on August 28
 Under the Counter. London production opened at the Phoenix Theatre on November 22 and ran for 665 performances
 Up in Central Park (Music: Sigmund Romberg Lyrics: Dorothy Fields Book: Herbert Fields and Dorothy Fields). Broadway production opened at the Century Theatre on January 27 and ran for 504 performances.

Musical films
 Anchors Aweigh starring Frank Sinatra, Kathryn Grayson and Gene Kelly. Directed by George Sidney.
 The Bells of St. Mary's starring Ingrid Bergman and Bing Crosby. Directed by Leo McCarey.Blonde from Brooklyn released June 21, starring Lynn Merrick and Richard Stanton, with Gwen Verdon in a minor role.
 Blonde Ransom starring Donald Cook and Virginia Grey. Directed by William Beaudine.
 Bring on the Girls starring Veronica Lake, Sonny Tufts, Eddie Bracken and Marjorie Reynolds and featuring Spike Jones and his Orchestra.
 Abbott and Costello in Hollywood starring Bud Abbott, Lou Costello, Frances Rafferty, Bob Stanton and Jean Porter. Directed by S. Sylvan Simon.
 Delightfully Dangerous starring Jane Powell, Ralph Bellamy, Constance Moore, Arthur Treacher and Morton Gould & his Orchestra. Directed by Arthur Lubin.
 Diamond Horseshoe aka Billy Rose's Diamond Horseshoe starring Betty Grable, Dick Haymes, Phil Silvers, William Gaxton and Beatrice Kay and featuring vaudevillian Willie Solar in his only filmed performance.
 The Dolly Sisters released November 14 starring Betty Grable, June Haver and John Payne.
 Duffy's Tavern starring Ed Gardner, Betty Hutton, Bing Crosby, Paulette Goddard, Dorothy Lamour, Eddie Bracken, Sonny Tufts, Barry Fitzgerald and Veronica Lake. Directed by Hal Walker.
 Eadie Was a Lady starring Ann Miller
 Here Come the Co-Eds starring Bud Abbott, Lou Costello and Peggy Ryan. Directed by Edgar Fairchild.
 Hit the Hay starring Judy Canova
 Let's Go Steady released January 4 starring Pat Parrish and Jackie Moran and featuring Mel Tormé and Skinnay Ennis.
 Nob Hill starring George Raft, Joan Bennett and Vivian Blaine.
 Out of This World starring Eddie Bracken, Veronica Lake and Cass Daley
 Rhapsody in Blue starring Robert Alda, Joan Leslie and Alexis Smith and featuring Hazel Scott.
 A Song for Miss Julie starring Shirley Ross
 State Fair starring Dick Haymes, Jeanne Crain, Dana Andrews and Vivian Blaine.
 The Stork Club starring Betty Hutton, Barry Fitzgerald, Don DeFore, Andy Russell and Robert BenchleyThrill of a Romance starring Van Johnson and Esther Williams and featuring Lauritz Melchior
 Tonight and Every Night starring Rita Hayworth, Lee Bowman and Janet Blair.
 Yolanda and the Thief starring Fred Astaire, Lucille Bremer, Frank Morgan, Mildred Natwick and Mary Nash. Directed by Vincente Minnelli.

Births
January 3 – Stephen Stills, singer-songwriter and guitarist
January 10 – Rod Stewart, rock singer
January 15 – Joan Marie Johnson, pop singer (The Dixie Cups)
January 17
William "Poogie" Hart, R&B singer-songwriter (The Delfonics)
Ivan Karabyts, Ukrainian conductor and composer
January 19 – Rod Evans (Deep Purple)
January 20 – Eric Stewart, singer-songwriter (The Mindbenders, 10cc)
January 26
Jacqueline du Pré, cellist (died 1987)
Ashley Hutchings, folk rock musician (Fairport Convention)
January 27 – Nick Mason, progressive rock musician (Pink Floyd)
January 28 – Robert Wyatt, Canterbury scene musician
February 6 – Bob Marley, reggae singer-songwriter, musician and guitarist (died 1981)
February 14 – Vic Briggs, blues and rock guitarist (The Animals)
February 20 – Alan Hull, folk rock singer-songwriter (Lindisfarne) (died 1995)
February 26
Bob Hite, blues rock singer (Canned Heat)
Mitch Ryder, rock and blues singer
February 27 – Carl Anderson, actor and singer
March 6 – Hugh Grundy, rock drummer (The Zombies)
March 7 – Arthur Lee (Love)
March 8 – Micky Dolenz, singer, songwriter and actor (The Monkees)
March 9 – Robin Trower rock guitarist and singer (Procol Harum)
March 10 – Ramón Ayala, accordion player and norteño
March 14
Jasper Carrott, English comedian, actor and musician
 Michael Martin Murphey, American singer-songwriter and guitarist
Walter Parazaider, American saxophonist (Chicago)
Herman van Veen, Dutch singer-songwriter and actor
March 17 – Sheryl Cormier, American Cajun accordionist
March 17 – Elis Regina, Brazilian singer (died 1982)
March 19 – Cem Karaca, Turkish rock musician
March 28 – Charles Portz, rock guitar bassist (The Turtles)
March 30 – Eric Clapton, blues guitarist and singer
April 1 – John Barbata, American rock drummer (Jefferson Starship, The Turtles)
April 9 – Steve Gadd, American session drummer
April 13 – Lowell George (Little Feat)
April 14 – Ritchie Blackmore (Deep Purple, Rainbow)
April 20 – Frank DiLeo, American actor and music industry executive
April 24 – Robert Knight, singer
April 25
Stu Cook, rock bass guitarist (Creedence Clearwater Revival)
Björn Ulvaeus, singer-songwriter (ABBA)
April 28 – John Wolters (Dr. Hook & the Medicine Show)
April 29 – Tammi Terrell, Soul singer (died 1970)
May 1 – Rita Coolidge, singer
May 2
Goldy McJohn, Steppenwolf
Judge Dread, English reggae singer/rapper (died 1998)
May 4 – Georg Wadenius (Blood, Sweat & Tears)
May 6
Bob Seger, singer-songwriter
Jimmie Dale Gilmore, country musician
May 7 – Christy Moore, folk musician
May 8 – Keith Jarrett, pianist and composer
May 9 – Steve Katz, jazz-rock guitarist, singer and producer (Blues Project, Blood, Sweat & Tears)
May 12 – Ian McLagan, keyboard player (The Faces) (died 2014)
May 13 – Magic Dick, rock harmonica player (The J. Geils Band)
May 19 – Pete Townshend, rock guitarist and singer-songwriter (The Who)
May 24 – Priscilla Presley, wife of Elvis
May 27 – Bruce Cockburn, Canadian singer/songwriter
May 28
John Fogerty, rock singer-songwriter and guitarist (Creedence Clearwater Revival)
Gary Stewart, American singer (died 2003)
Chayito Valdez, folk singer (died 2016)
May 29 – Gary Brooker, rock singer-songwriter and keyboardist (Procol Harum) (died 2022)
June 1
Linda Scott, singer
Frederica von Stade, operatic mezzo-soprano
June 2 – Lord David Dundas, singer and composer
June 4
Gordon Waller, singer (Peter and Gordon)
Anthony Braxton, avant-garde jazz composer
June 14 – Rod Argent, rock keyboardist and singer (The Zombies, Argent)
June 20 – Anne Murray, singer
June 24 – Colin Blunstone, rock singer (The Zombies)
June 25
Labi Siffre, singer-songwriter
Carly Simon, singer-songwriter
July 26 – Betty Davis, singer
June 28 – David Knights, rock guitar bassist (Procol Harum)
July 1
Mike Burstyn, American actor and singer
Debbie Harry, American singer-songwriter and actress (Blondie)
July 6 – Rik Elswit, rock guitarist (Dr. Hook & the Medicine Show)
July 14 – Jim Gordon, rock drummer (Derek and the Dominos) (died 2023)
July 15 – Peter Lewis (Moby Grape)
July 18 – Danny McCulloch (The Animals)
July 20
Kim Carnes, singer
John Lodge (The Moody Blues)
July 23 – Dino Danelli, rock drummer (The Rascals)
July 26 – Betty Davis, funk and soul singer
July 30 – David Sanborn, saxophonist
August 16 – Gary Loizzo, rock singer and guitarist (The American Breed)
August 18 – Barbara Harris, pop singer (The Toys)
August 19 – Ian Gillan, rock singer (Deep Purple)
August 24
Ronee Blakley, actress, singer-songwriter and composer
Malcolm "Molly" Duncan, blues tenor saxophonist (Average White Band)
Ken Hensley hard rock singer-songwriter (Uriah Heep (band))
Randy Silverman, doo-wop singer (Vito & The Salutations)
August 31
Van Morrison, musician
Itzhak Perlman, violinist
Bob Welch, musician & singer
September 4 – Bill Kenwright, producer of West End musicals
September 5 – Al Stewart, singer-songwriter
September 8
Ron "Pigpen" McKernan, rock musician (Grateful Dead) (died 1973)
Kelly Groucutt, rock musician (Electric Light Orchestra) (died 2009)
September 9
Richard Divall, conductor and musicologist (died 2017)
Dee Dee Sharp, R&B singer
September 10 – Jose Feliciano, singer-songwriter and guitarist
September 15 – Jessye Norman, operatic soprano (died 2019)
September 17 – Danny Rivera, singer
September 19 – David Bromberg, guitarist
September 23 – Paul Petersen, singer and actor
September 24 – John Rutter, choral composer
September 25 – Owen "Onnie" McIntyre, soul guitarist and singer (Average White Band)
September 26
Gal Costa, Brazilian singer
Bryan Ferry, English singer-songwriter
October 1 – Donny Hathaway, singer and musician (died 1979)
October 2 – Don McLean, singer-songwriter
October 7 – Kevin Godley, singer-songwriter
October 9 – Chucho Valdés, jazz musician
October 10 – Alan Cartwright (Procol Harum)
October 13 – Christophe, singer-songwriter (died 2020)
October 19 – Jeannie C. Riley, country singer
October 22 – Leslie West (Mountain) (The Vagrants)
October 28 – Wayne Fontana, beat singer (died 2020)
October 29 – Melba Moore, singer
October 31 – Russ Ballard, singer-songwriter (Argent)
November 8
Donald Murray (The Turtles)
Arnold Rosner, composer
November 10 – Donna Fargo, country musician
November 11
Chris Dreja, British rock guitarist (The Yardbirds)
Vince Martell, American rock guitarist (Vanilla Fudge)
November 12 – Neil Young, singer-songwriter
November 13 – Bobby Manuel, American guitarist and producer (Booker T. & the M.G.'s)
November 15 – Anni-Frid Lyngstad, singer (ABBA)
November 16 – Teenie Hodges, American guitarist and songwriter (Hi Rhythm Section) (died 2014)
November 20 – Dan McBride (Sha Na Na)
November 24 – Lee Michaels, keyboardist and singer
November 26 – John McVie, guitarist (Fleetwood Mac)
November 30 – Radu Lupu, classical pianist (died 2022)
December 1 – Bette Midler, singer and actress
December 10 – Toots Hibbert, reggae singer-songwriter (Toots & the Maytals)
December 12
Allan Ward, English beat guitarist (The Honeycombs)
Tony Williams, American drummer, composer and producer (The Tony Williams Lifetime) (died 1997)
December 14 – Stanley Crouch, music critic
December 20 – Peter Criss, hard-rock drummer (KISS)
December 23 – Ron Bushy, rock drummer (Iron Butterfly)
December 24 – Lemmy, born Ian Kilmister, heavy metal musician (Motörhead) (died 2015)
December 25 – Noel Redding, rock guitar bassist (Jimi Hendrix Experience) (died 2003)
December 27 – Clarence Barlow, composer
December 30 – Davy Jones, singer and actor (died 2012)date unknown – Abed Azrie, singer

Deaths
January 4 – Michael Coleman, fiddle player (born 1891)
January 17 – Malcolm McEachern, operatic bass (born 1883)
January 30 – Herbert L. Clarke, cornet virtuoso and composer (born 1867)
February – David Beigelman, violinist, orchestra leader and composer (born 1887) (murdered in Auschwitz concentration camp)
February 5 – Volga Hayworth, showgirl (born 1897)
February 7 – Aldo Finzi, composer (born 1897)
February 11 – Al Dubin, songwriter (born 1891)
February 25 – Mário de Andrade, writer and musicologist (born 1893)
March 2 – Jean-Baptiste Lemire, composer (born 1867)
March 3 – Blanche Arral, operatic soprano (born 1864)
April 1 – May Beatty, New Zealand singer (born 1880)
April 4 – Berta Bock, Romanian composer (born 1857)
April 15 – Raffaello Squarise, violinist, conductor and composer (born 1856)
April 19 – Alois Burgstaller, operatic tenor (born 1872)
April 25
Elmer Samuel Hosmer, composer (born 1862)
Teddy Weatherford, jazz pianist (born 1903) (cholera)
April 29 – Dezső d'Antalffy, Hungarian organist and composer (born 1885)
May 15 – Kenneth J. Alford, band composer (born 1881)
May 31 – Gustave Huberdeau, operatic bass-baritone (born 1874)
June 26 – Nikolai Tcherepnin, composer (born 1873)
June 28 – Jonny Heykens, Dutch composer and orchestra leader (born 1884)
July 24 – Rosina Storchio, operatic soprano (born 1876)
August 2
Pietro Mascagni, composer (born 1863)
Emil von Reznicek, composer (born 1860)
August 19 – Carl Wilhelm Kern, pianist and composer (born 1874)
August 23 – Leo Borchard, conductor (born 1899) (shot)
August 31 – Elsa Stralia, operatic soprano (born 1881)
September 8 – Leo Rich Lewis, composer (born 1865)
September 15 – Anton Webern, composer (born 1883) (shot)
September 16 – John McCormack, tenor (born 1884)
September 18 – Blind Willie Johnson, gospel singer and guitarist (born 1897) (pneumonia)
September 25 – Julius Korngold, music critic (born 1860)
September 26 – Béla Bartók, composer (born 1881)
October 16 – James V. Monaco, Italian-born US composer (born 1885)
November 3 – Alessandro Longo, composer and musicologist (born 1864)
November 7 – Gus Edwards, Prussian-born US songwriter, entertainer and producer (born 1879)
November 11 – Jerome Kern, composer (born 1885) (cerebral haemorrhage)
December 24 – Adelina Stehle, operatic soprano (born 1860)
December 30 – France Ačko, Slovenian organist and composer (born 1904)date unknown''
Viktor Selyavin, operatic tenor (born 1875)
Joseph Fournier de Belleval, operatic baritone and music teacher (born 1892)

References

 
20th century in music
Music by year